Overtime Elite is a professional basketball league for 16–20-year-olds, based in Atlanta, Georgia. The league is owned and operated by Overtime and was founded by Dan Porter and Zack Weiner.

History 
Overtime launched the Overtime Elite professional basketball league in 2021 for American and international basketball players between the ages of 16–20. Players receive a minimum salary of $100,000 annually, a signing bonus, and shares in Overtime's larger business. Players can also choose a scholarship option and maintain college eligibility.  The company provides health and disability insurance and sets aside $100,000 in college scholarship money for each player if they decide not to pursue professional basketball afterwards.

Athletes participate in an academic program featuring a 4:1 student-teacher ratio and a curriculum offering traditional high school subjects alongside life skill-related subjects in financial literacy, social media and other media training, and mental health and wellness.

In April 2021, Overtime Elite hired former NBA player, University of Connecticut head coach, and NCAA Champion Kevin Ollie as its first head coach and head of player development.

In May 2021, Overtime Elite announced the signings of Matt and Ryan Bewley, the first prep underclassmen to sign contracts with an American professional basketball league. The league also signed Dominican guard Jean Montero in June 2021 as its first international player and 16-year-old Jalen Lewis, the youngest American professional basketball player in history, in July 2021.

In September 2021, Overtime Elite announced an exclusive partnership with Topps to create basketball trading cards on Overtime Elite athletes, marking the return of Topps to basketball trading cards. In October 2021, Overtime Elite announced Gatorade and State Farm as brand partners.

In January 2022, Overtime Elite announced a partnership with Meta to develop virtual reality content for the league.

In April 2022, Overtime Elite announced the signing of Naasir Cunningham the number one basketball prospect in ESPN's Class of 2024. Cunningham is the first Overtime Elite player to forgo being paid a salary, preserving college basketball eligibility after graduating from high school.

In July 2022, Pau Gasol joined Carmelo Anthony and Jay Williams on the Overtime Elite board of directors.

In September 2022, Damien Wilkins was named general manager and Head of Basketball.

In October 2022, Overtime Elite announced a partnership with GMC.

In November 2022, Overtime Elite and Amazon Prime Video agreed to a multi-year global distribution partnership to stream 20 live Overtime Elite games per season for the league's next three seasons alongside the launch of a series on Overtime Elite in 2023.

Overtime Elite Arena 
Overtime Elite built a 103,000 square-foot facility in the Atlantic Stations section of Atlanta where players train, study, and compete. The building has three NBA regulation-sized courts, including a neon-bedecked "show court arena" that can seat up to 1,300 spectators. The building also has a 7,000-square-foot fitness center, a hydrotherapy room, classroom spaces, a dining hall, and locker rooms. The main court uses high-definition lights previously used only at Staples Center and Barclays Center. The building was completed within six months.

In June and July 2022, the Professional Fighters League held three regular season events at Overtime Elite Arena.

Season 1 (2021–2022) 

Overtime Elite's inaugural season consisted of three teams, Team Elite, Team OTE, and Team Overtime, playing against each other and against prep schools and high schools. In May 2021, Overtime Elite announced the signing of Amen and Ausar Thompson, top-ranked guards in the 2022 class, and Matt and Ryan Bewley, top-ranked power forward prospects in the 2023 class. 

In the league's first season, Team Elite defeated Team OTE 52–45 in Game 3 of the Finals to become the first league champion. Ausar Thompson was named MVP of the Overtime Elite Finals. 

After the season, Overtime Elite's Dominick Barlow signed a two-way contract with the San Antonio Spurs, later becoming the first Overtime Elite prospect to play in the NBA on November 2, 2022. Jean Montero also signed an Exhibit 10 contract with the New York Knicks. Emmanuel Maldonado was also drafted by Mets de Guaynabo in the Baloncesto Superior Nacional League in Puerto Rico.

In the summer of 2022, a group of Overtime Elite players competed in The Basketball Tournament and traveled to Europe to compete against professional clubs Basquet Girona, KK Mega Baskett, and KK Studentski centar.

Season 2 (2022–2023) 
In April 2022, Overtime Elite announced the signing of top-ranked 2024 recruit Naasir Cunningham, the first Overtime Elite player to accept a scholarship instead of a salary.

In July 2022, Overtime Elite announced the signing of 8 new players for the 2022 season.

In September 2022, Overtime Elite announced their expansion to 6 teams. Team Elite, Team OTE, and Team Overtime were rebranded as the City Reapers, YNG Dreamerz, and Cold Hearts. High School teams Hillcrest Prep Bruins, Our Savior Lutheran Falcons, and Word of God Holy Rams joined Overtime Elite for the second season. In the same month, Overtime Elite announced a 90-game schedule with non-league games against Bryce and Bronny James, Cam Boozer, and Jared McCain.

In October 2022, Overtime Elite announced a multi-year partnership with GMC.

In November 2022, Overtime Elite announced the signing of top-ranked 2023 recruit Robert Dillingham.

Ausar Thompson was named regular season MVP.

The City Reapers defeated the YNG Dreamerz 3-0 in the OTE Finals. Ausar Thompson was named finals MVP.

Current roster

Notable alumni

References

Basketball leagues in the United States 
Men's basketball
Professional sports leagues in the United States